The Constitutionalist Liberal Party is a political party in Nicaragua.  At the Nicaraguan general election of 5 November 2006, the party won 25 of 92 seats in the National Assembly. However, the party suffered a devastating loss in the 2011 general election, losing 23 seats in the National Assembly.

History

The Constitutionalist Liberal Party is the political successor of the Democratic Party, a faction which has existed since Nicaragua became independent during the 1830s. After being defeated by the Legitimists (future members of the Conservative Party) in a civil war in the 1850s, the Democratic Party returned to power in 1893 under President José Santos Zelaya, who lost power in 1909.

Under pressure from American troops who had occupied Nicaragua, the Democrats lost power the following year, and remained out of power until 1926 when, following another revolt, they forced the Conservatives into a coalition government. Some factions of the Democratic Party, along with some factions of the Conservative Party, supported Anastasio Somoza García, who gained power in the 1930s, defeating another Democratic faction led by Augusto Sandino, who continued fighting after the 1926 coalition agreement. The Democrats and Conservatives were both marginalized by the Somoza family, who formed the Nationalist Liberal Party, and continued to be out of power when the Somozas were overthrown by the Sandinista National Liberation Front in 1979.

In 1968, Ramiro Sacasa Guerro, a relative of the Somozas and education minister, opposed Anastasio Somoza Debayle's re-election bid and formed the Constitutionalist Liberal Movement (MLC) faction within the Nationalist Liberal Party. The formation of this faction, which believed in opposing Somoza by political means instead of through armed struggle, led to Somoza dismissing Sacasa from his position. After the Sandinista victory in 1979, the MLC earned a seat on the Council of State which was founded following the end of Somoza's rule, but that seat was soon revoked following the FSLN's accusations of the MLC's lack of representation. After Sacasa's death in a car accident, the MLC became a political party in 1983, and again gained a seat in the Council of State, occupied by Public Prosecutor Julio Centeno.

The Democratic Party had by this time split into many Liberal groups, many of whom supported the United Nicaraguan Opposition which successfully opposed the Sandinistas in the 1990 elections. By the late 1990s, led by Arnoldo Alemán, most of the Democratic/Liberal groups consolidated to form the Constitutionalist Liberal Party, which was at first known as the Liberal Alliance. In 1996 Alemán won the presidential election and served as president until 2002, while the party won 42 of the 93 seats in the 1996 congressional elections, more than any other party. At the November 2001 elections, the party gained a majority in Congress, winning 47 of 92 seats. The same day, its candidate Enrique Bolaños won the presidential elections.

Though still a strong force in Nicaragua, there have been many disputes within it since 2001 which, by 2006, had caused it to lose its majority in Congress and the presidency. Bolaños broke with the PLC to form the Alliance for the Republic. José Rizo was nominated as the presidential candidate and José Antonio Alvarado was nominated as the vice-presidential candidate for the November 2006 elections. Eduardo Montealegre, another presidential candidate for the elections, was a former member of the Constitutionalist Liberal Party and formed the Nicaraguan Liberal Alliance which includes other former PLC members. Montealegre and Rizo were both defeated, as Sandinista Daniel Ortega finished far enough ahead of both of them to avoid a runoff. Rizo came in third place with 26% of the vote. The party came in second place in the congressional elections.

The party was a member of the Liberal International, but left that organization in 2005.

Electoral History

Presidential elections

References

External links
Official Website

1968 establishments in Nicaragua
Conservative parties in Nicaragua
Organizations of the Nicaraguan Revolution
Political parties established in 1968
Political parties in Nicaragua
Liberal parties in Nicaragua